Aakrosham is a 1982 Indian Malayalam-language action film written, directed and produced by A. B. Raj. The film stars Prem Nazir, Srividya, Mohanlal and Rajalakshmi in the lead roles. The film has musical score by Ben Surendar.

Cast
Prem Nazir as Commissioner Rajashekharan Thambi
Srividya as Prabha Rajashekharan Thambi
Mohanlal as Mohanachandran
Rajalakshmi as Nirmala
Balan K. Nair as Kollakkaaran Ganga (Gangadharan)
Rajkumar as Premachandran
Ranipadmini as Rekha
Sathyakala as Geetha
T. G. Ravi as Bhadran
Master Manoj as Biju

Soundtrack
The music was composed by Ben Surendar and the lyrics were written by Sreekumaran Thampi.

References

External links
 

1982 films
1980s Malayalam-language films